This is a list of homicides in Wisconsin. This list includes notable homicides committed in the U.S. state of Wisconsin that have a Wikipedia article on the killing, the  killer, or the victim.  It is divided into three subject areas as follows:
 Multiple homicides – homicides having multiple victims.
 Serial killers – persons who murder three or more persons with the incidents taking place over more than a month and including a significant period of time between them
 Single homicides – notable homicides involving a single fatality

Among the works dealing with homicides in Wisconsin are Wisconsin Murders by August Derleth and Got Murder? The Shocking Story of Wisconsin's Notorious Killers by Martin Hintz.

Multiple homicides
Listed in chronological order

Serial killers
Listed in chronological order by date of earliest homicide

Single homicides

References 

Death-related lists
Killings in the United States
Wisconsin-related lists
Murder in Wisconsin
History of Wisconsin